David Henry Spencer Morgan  (born 29 December 1947) is a former British Navy and RAF pilot who flew on attachment to the Fleet Air Arm of the Royal Navy during the Falklands War in 1982 where he became the most successful British fighter pilot of the conflict and was also involved in the last dogfight by British fighter pilots in which enemy aircraft were destroyed.

Early life 
Morgan was born on 29 December 1947 in Folkestone, Kent, his father was a World War II naval fighter pilot. He was educated at Sir Roger Manwood's School in Sandwich, Kent, and at the age of 16 he applied for a scholarship to join the Navy where it was discovered that he had a hole in the heart (atrial septal defect), this was successfully operated on. He attended the Britannia Royal Naval College in Dartmouth as an aviator and was commissioned in 1967 going on to be the first British serviceman to become a pilot after having had open heart surgery.

Early career 

Morgan joined the Fleet Air Arm of the Royal Navy in 1966 initially limited to flying helicopters owing to the operation on his heart but then transferred to the RAF in the hope of flying jets.  He served first as an RAF Wessex helicopter pilot, notably in Northern Ireland with 72 Squadron in the 1970s during the Troubles. He then converted to Harrier jump jets serving in Germany, and after having accumulated nearly 1,000 hours was attached to 899 Naval Air Squadron of the Fleet Air Arm and was in the process of converting to Sea Harriers when the Falklands War began. He was subsequently attached as a Flight Lieutenant to 800 Naval Air Squadron on the aircraft carrier , which was part of the task force sent to reclaim the islands following the Argentinian invasion.

Falklands war 
Morgan took part in various strafing attacks notably of an Argentinian trawler, the Narwal engaged in intelligence gathering, which had refused an order to leave the area. He also participated in the first strafing attack of Argentinian aircraft, including Pucarás, on Port Stanley airport. During this attack his aircraft was hit by anti-aircraft fire. On 23 May, with his wingman, Flt Lt John Leeming, he engaged a group of two Puma helicopters and an Agusta Westland A109 helicopter. The Pumas were forced down and destroyed by the pair after their crews had escaped, and the A109 was hit during the engagement and later destroyed by other aircraft after landing. One of the Pumas was confirmed as a kill for Morgan.

On 8 June, during what was supposed to be a training flight, Morgan was approaching Bluff Cove when he saw two British landing ships, Sir Galahad and Sir Tristram, on fire following an air attack by Argentinian Douglas A-4 Skyhawks. These vessels and others in the area were ferrying elements of the Welsh Guards and Royal Marines to shore. Morgan and his wingman, Lt David Smith (RN), kept a protective flying patrol over the scene for 40 minutes, until they saw a landing craft under attack by four A-4Q Skyhawk fighter-bombers of the Argentinian Navy. The Skyhawk pilots dropped bombs aimed at the craft. Before Morgan and Smith could intervene, six Marines were killed and the landing craft had begun to sink. Morgan had only enough fuel to engage for two minutes, before returning to his ship; despite this, he fired an AIM-9 Sidewinder missile at the first Skyhawk, flown by Danilo Bolzán and destroyed it, killing Bolzán. A second aircraft, flown by Alfredo Vázquez was hit by cannon fire from Morgan and destroyed. While Vázquez appeared to eject safely, he too was killed. A third Skyhawk, flown by Juan Arrarás, was shot down by Smith. In the meantime, the surviving Argentinian pilot, Héctor Sánchez had managed to line up Morgan's Harrier in his gunsight; when Sánchez attempted to fire, however, his cannon jammed. While Morgan was no longer at risk of being shot down, his Harrier was badly damaged and, reportedly, losing fuel. For part of the return leg to Hermes, Morgan glided to conserve fuel; after he had landed safely it was found that only enough fuel for about 90 seconds of flight remained in his Harrier. Morgan's tally of aircraft destroyed – two fighters, one helicopter and one  helicopter shared – made Morgan the  British fighter pilot most successful in air combat during the conflict.  Morgan and Smith's clash with the Skyhawks was the last air-to-air combat in which aircraft were destroyed by UK pilots (as of July 2021).

Suffering from post-traumatic stress disorder (PTSD) as a result of his combat experiences, Morgan attributed the subsequent termination of his marriage to the disorder.

Award citation 

Morgan was awarded the Distinguished Service Cross for services during the operations in the South Atlantic:

"The Sea Harrier pilots of 800 and 899 Naval Air Squadrons embarked in HMS HERMES have shown great courage in the air battle over and around the Falkland Islands which started at the end of April and continued throughout May. They were required to fly sortie after sortie, sometimes as many as four per day, often in appalling weather conditions, but remained steadfast and determined under continuous stress and constant danger. Their contribution enabled the Task Force to gain air superiority and thus almost certainly saved many lives which would otherwise have been lost in enemy air attacks. Flight Lieutenant Morgan has flown 50 operational sorties. During one sortie, he attacked a Puma helicopter with guns causing it to crash into a hill and, on a separate occasion, he and his wing man attacked and destroyed an entire formation of four Mirages, Flight Lieutenant Morgan himself shooting down two enemy aircraft."

Postwar reconciliation 
In 1993 Morgan was contacted by the journalist Maxi Gainza who asked him to participate in a meeting with Hector Sanchez, the Argentinian pilot of the 4th Skyhawk A-4B that he had engaged with on 8 June 1982. Sanchez was serving in the Persian Gulf and met with Morgan on his way home to Argentina. Morgan stated that this meeting and their subsequent friendship enabled him to overcome his PTSD particularly because Sanchez was also suffering from the same illness. This was part of a reconciliation effort by veterans from both sides and that included a number of encounters between servicemen highlighted in a series of portraits by the Argentinian anthropologist . Neil Wilkinson, an anti-aircraft gunner, met Mariano Velasco, the pilot that he shot down, and Simon Weston met Carlos Cachon, the Argentinian pilot that bombed Sir Galahad with Weston on board. Morgan also had contact with Major Roberto Yanzi, the pilot of one of the Pumas that he had shot down. In 2018 he met Pablo Bolzán, the son of Danilo Bolzán, accompanied him to the Falkland Islands, and placed a memorial next to the wreck of Bolzán's aircraft.

Later life 
In 2007 Morgan published a book entitled Hostile Skies: My Falklands Air War, and has also written poetry about his experiences. After the conflict he continued to serve as a Harrier test pilot and instructor. Morgan transferred permanently to the Navy in 1984, and finally left in 1992 holding the rank of Lieutenant Commander. He then became a commercial pilot for Virgin Atlantic. Morgan is married and lives in Dorset, and has two children and five grandchildren.

Bibliography

References

External links

Imperial War Museum
Raúl Díaz

1947 births
Living people
Fleet Air Arm aviators
Recipients of the Distinguished Service Cross (United Kingdom)
Royal Navy officers
Royal Air Force personnel of the Falklands War
Royal Navy personnel of the Falklands War
Falklands War pilots
People from Folkestone